Noblesse is a South Korean manhwa released as a webtoon written by Son Je-ho and illustrated by Lee Kwangsu. Noblesse was first posted on Naver Corporation's webtoon platform Naver Webtoon in December 2007, and was concluded in January 2019; it was among the first webtoons to receive an official English translation at the launch of Line Webtoon in July 2014. It has been adapted into an aeni in 2015 and an original net animation (ONA) in 2016, and an anime television series by Production I.G aired from October to December 2020 on Crunchyroll.

Plot

A powerful noble, Cadis Etrama Di Raizel (referred to as Rai), has been asleep for 820 years with no knowledge of mankind's advancement and scientific successes. At the start of the webtoon, Rai wakes up in an abandoned building in South Korea, and starts to get used to the modern world. He goes to a school, where he reunites with his loyal servant Frankenstein. With Frankenstein's help, Rai enrolls into high school and inadvertently befriends athletic teenager Shinwoo, computer geek Ikhan, and Shinwoo's crush Yuna, and a few others. Noblesse follows the group's often dangerous adventures against a secret organization while uncovering Rai's past.

Characters
Cadis Etrama Di Raizel (a.k.a. Rai)

A Noble from Lukedonia who holds the special title of Noblesse, which distinguishes him from all other Nobles as their hidden protector, their judge, and if necessary, executioner. He is Frankenstein's Master and currently attends Ye Ran High School in order to learn more about the modern human world.
Frankenstein

Raizel's devoted servant and has loyally served him for over 820 years. He is a scientist, whose abandoned research notes helped to bring the Union's scientific knowledge and technology to the advanced level it has reached in the series. Frankenstein is also the founder and current principal of Ye Ran High School, where he is known to all as the Principal. He is now the latest addition to the RK-5 bearing the title of “Number 0”.
Han Shinwoo (Spelt "Shinwu" in English) / Yusuke Tashiro (anime)
; John Omohundro (English)
A student of Ye Ran High School and the first person to befriend Raizel after he wakes up from his 820-year slumber. He is also an incredibly skilled martial artist and Ikhan's best friend.
Woo Ikhan / Manabu Kase (anime)

A student at Ye Ran High School and Shinwoo's best friend. He is also a close friend of Frankenstein's household, where he usually hangs out with the rest of his friends. He is very knowledgeable when it comes to technology and hacking.
Seo Yuna / Suh Yuna (ONA) / Emi Iwata (anime)

A student of Ye Ran High School and a close friend of the Frankenstein household, where she regularly hangs out with the rest of the gang.
Lim Sui
Sui is a popular pop idol who is studying at Ye Ran High School. She first appeared in chapter 94 of the series, in which she is returning to school after doing her concert. Sui is friends with Ikhan, Shinwoo and Yuna; she is always shown hanging out with the group. She later joined Shinwoo and the others in visiting Frankenstein's house regularly.
Muzaka

The Previous Lord

Ashleen

Maduke

Gejutel K. Landegre

Lagus Tradio

Roctis Kravei

Urokai Agvain

Zarga Siriana

M-21

M-24

Jake

Marie

Regis K. Landegre

Seira J. Loyard

Tao
; Lucien Dodge (English)

Takeo

Kranz

Shark

Hammer

Erga Kenesis Di Raskreia

Ludis Mergas

Karias Blerster

Rajak Kertia
; Chris Hackney (English)

Rael Kertia

Nobles/Noblesse
An ancient and powerful race that possess great strength, speed and telepathy as well as various blood related abilities, such as the talent to grant similar powers to others via contracts "of blood and soul." They reside on an island nation, known as Lukedonia, that cannot be detected by human senses. They have guarded humans against predators and the forces of nature as long as they have existed, due to a genetic inability to ignore the slaughter of the weak, helpless humans. Thousands of years ago, they were worshipped as gods by various cultures around the world.

Animation

2015 Animation
The first animated version of Noblesse was revealed at the 17th Bucheon International Animation Festival. Its screening time was 37 minutes. It was produced by Studio Animal, a South Korean animation studio, and the animation was first released as a DVD by Woongjin Thinkbig Funnism on December 4, 2015, while its VOD service started later on February 4, 2016.

Anime
On December 4, 2015, Noblesse: Beginning of Destruction (Kor. 노블레스: 파멸의 시작: Pamyeol-ui Sijak) was created by Korean animation studio as the first full-length animated version of Noblesse. It was an OVA revealed at the 17th Bucheon International Animation Festival in DVD form, from Woongjin Thinkbig Funnism.

On February 4, 2016, a 31-minute original net animation (ONA), titled Noblesse: Awakening, was released on Crunchyroll and YouTube. Animated by Production I.G, the anime covers the first volume of the manhwa in a heavily abridged format with several minor changes to the story.

On August 2, 2019 at Comic Con Seoul, it was announced that an anime television series adaptation was currently in production. Production I.G animated the series, and Crunchyroll streamed it internationally outside Asian regions as a co-production. The series is licensed by Muse Communication in Southeast Asia. In an interview, Jeho Son said during an interview for the series "We recently completed Noblesse, which is a very special project to us. As of this year, it has taken us 11 long years to complete this project. When Lee Kwang Soo and I began work on Noblesse, we thought of the many dreams we wanted to accomplish together. One of the dreams was to have one of our works showcased as a TV animation, which came true. This was all thanks to our viewers, who showed love for Noblesse. I would like to thank Naver, Webtoon, and Production I.G for doing an amazing job on the animation. I hope the viewers find Noblesse exciting and enjoy watching it." The series was directed by Yasutaka Yamamoto, with Sayaka Harada handling series composition, and Akiharu Ishii handling character designs. Yoshihiro Ike and Shun Narita composed the series' music.

It aired from October 7 to December 30, 2020 on Crunchyroll. In Japan, the series was televised an hour after its Crunchyroll launch, on Tokyo MX and two hours and thirty minutes after, on BS11. Kim Jae-joong performed the series' opening theme song "BREAKING DAWN", while Oh My Girl performed the series' ending theme song "Etoile." On November 11, 2020, Crunchyroll announced dubs for the series in English, Spanish, Portuguese, French and German, which premiered on November 18, 2020.

On May 18, 2021, it was announced Sentai Filmworks picked up the home video rights.

The Noblesse anime series takes place directly after the events of the Noblesse: Awakening ONA, and begins from the second volume of the manhwa.

Other media
On November 7, 2016, Air Seoul announced that it had collaborated with Naver Webtoon to produce a safety video. Some of the works shown here include Denma, The Sound of Heart, and Noblesse.

In March 2016, four characters from Noblesse were added as player characters in Nexon's 2015 mobile game Fantasy War Tactics. For the duration of the month, various special Noblesse-related items were added, such as a "Noblesse Coin" and "Noblesse Black Coocoo" equipment.

In June 2016, the Noblesse event returned, adding Raizel as a fifth hero.

The first episode of Alpha is about the Union, the modified human, and the experimenter. At the end, there is a logo called JHS studio, which reveals that Alpha, and this work are in the same world. Because the representative of JHS studio is Son Je-ho, who was the author of this work.

Notes

References

External links
 Official website on Naver Webtoon 
 Official website on Line Webtoon 
 Official anime website 
 Author Jeho-Son's Blog 
 Author Gwang-su's Blog 
 Noblesse Official Fan Cafe 
 Alpha on Naver Webtoon 
 
 

2000s webtoons
2007 webtoon debuts
2016 anime OVAs
Anime based on manhwa
Werewolf comics
Crunchyroll Originals
Dark fantasy anime and manga
Manhwa titles
Naver Comics titles
Production I.G
Sentai Filmworks
South Korean webtoons
Vampires in animation
Vampires in comics
Webtoons in print
Muse Communication